Mahaut Mondino is a Paris-born singer-songwriter.

Background
Mahaut is the daughter of photographer Jean-Baptiste Mondino. L'Orèal was one of the first major entities to commission her to make original music for their perfume brand Cacharel. She co-wrote her very first original music for Cacharel's 'Amor Amor' and 'Forbidden Kiss' perfume commercials with producer Mirwais at 17. Fashion house Yves Saint Laurent and the global Mama Shelter Hotel chain later asked Mondino to create music for their brands as well.

In 2013, production duo Supreme Cuts from Chicago featured Mahaut on two of their tracks, one of which, "Gone", ended up as lead track off their album 'Divine Ecstasy'. After performing at SXSW in 2014, Mahaut released her first track 'Voodoo Me' co-produced by Young & Sick. The song was premiered on Vice magazine's Noisey.com.

Mondino's first track 'Jungle', off her debut EP, was premiered by Hunger Magazine in the UK.

In late 2015 Mahaut began collaborating with legendary producer Dave Stewart with whom she co-wrote her single 'Summertime', a unique urban blend of electronica and blues.

Mondino has been featured in a variety of press including Elle Magazine, Vogue Magazine, FACT Magazine, VICE, and others.

References

Year of birth missing (living people)
Living people
French singer-songwriters